Mohit
is a given name. Notable people with the name include:

 Mohit Abrol, Indian television actor
 Mohit Ahlawat (actor) (born 1982), Indian actor
 Mohit Ahlawat (cricketer) (born 1995), Indian first-class cricketer
 Mohit Aron (born 1973), Indian businessman and entrepreneur
 Mohit Banerji (1912–1961), pioneer of the Communist Party of India in West Bengal, India
 Mohit Bhandari, Indian surgeon
 Mohit Chadda, Indian film actor
 Mohit Chattopadhyay (1934–2012), Bengali Indian playwright, screenwriter, dramatist and poet
 Mohit Chauhan (born 1966), Indian singer
 Mohit Chauhan (actor), Bollywood actor from India
 Mohit Handa (born 1993), Indian cricketer
 Mohit Hooda (born 1998), Indian cricketer
 Mohit Mayur Jayaprakash (born 1993), Indian tennis player
 Mohit Madaan, Bollywood actor
 Mohit Malhotra (born 1986), Indian model and actor
 Mohit Malik, Indian television actor
 Mohit Marwah, Bollywood actor
 Mohit Moitra, Indian revolutionary and independence fighter in the 1930s
 Mohit Raina, Indian actor
 Mohit Ray (born 1954), Indian environmental and human rights activist
 Mohit Sehgal, Indian television actor
 Mohit Sen (1929–2003), Bengali communist intellectual
 Mohit Sharma (born 1988), Indian cricketer
 Mohit Sharma (Delhi cricketer) (born 1991), Indian cricketer
 Mohit Sharma (soldier), Indian Military Officer
 Mohit Suri (born 1981), Indian film director
 Mohit Thadani (born 1991), Rajasthani cricketer